Current Problems in Pediatric and Adolescent Health Care is a monthly peer-reviewed medical review journal covering pediatric and adolescent medicine. It was established in 1970 as Current Problems in Pediatrics, obtaining its current name in 2001. It is published by Elsevier and the editor-in-chief is Arthur Fierman (New York University School of Medicine). According to the Journal Citation Reports, the journal has a 2016 impact factor of 2.327.

References

External links

Pediatrics journals
Elsevier academic journals
Publications established in 1970
Monthly journals
Review journals
English-language journals